Norm Macdonald: Nothing Special is a stand-up comedy special featuring Norm Macdonald, consisting of 50 minutes of previously unreleased material recorded by Macdonald in June 2020, and a half-hour roundtable discussion featuring his friends and colleagues reflecting on his life and career. It was released on Netflix on May 30, 2022, eight months after Macdonald's death from acute leukemia.

The special earned three Primetime Emmy Award nominations for Outstanding Variety Special (Pre-Recorded), Outstanding Writing for a Variety Special, and Outstanding Directing for a Variety Special, marking Macdonald's first Primetime Emmy nominations.

Cast
Norm Macdonald
Dave Chappelle
David Letterman
Conan O'Brien
Adam Sandler
Molly Shannon
David Spade

Production
Macdonald had planned to tape the material with a live audience at a venue in Los Angeles, but owing to his health challenges and the COVID-19 pandemic, he elected to record the material alone in the apartment of his producing partner Lori Jo Hoekstra to ensure it would be available to view. Hoekstra commented: "While this version of Nothing Special was not originally meant to be the final product, COVID restrictions prevented him from filming in front of an audience. We want to make sure his fans see this very funny hour. He left this gift for all of us." Macdonald recorded the material on June 28, 2020, not long after his multiple myeloma had returned from remission and metastasized into myelodysplastic syndrome.

The concluding roundtable discussion, which features several of Macdonald's friends and collaborators commenting on the special and Macdonald's life, was taped during the May 2022 "Netflix Is a Joke" festival.

Reception

Critical response

Accolades

References

External links
 
 
 

American comedy films
Netflix specials
Films impacted by the COVID-19 pandemic
Films directed by Jeff Tomsic
Stand-up comedy concert films
2020s American films
Norm Macdonald